Ayer Keroh is a state constituency in Malacca, Malaysia, that has been represented in the Malacca State Legislative Assembly from 1974 to 1986, from 1995 to present.

The state constituency was created in the 1974 redistribution and is mandated to return a single member to the Malacca State Legislative Assembly under the first past the post voting system. , the State Assemblyman for Ayer Keroh is Kerk Chee Yee from the Democratic Action Party (DAP) which is part of the state's opposition coalition, Pakatan Harapan (PH).

Demographics

History
It was abolished in 1986 when it was redistributed. It was re-created in 1994.

The Ayer Keroh constituency contains the polling districts of Taman Melaka Baru, Sungai Putat, Taman Bukit Melaka, Ayer Keroh Heights, Kampung Ayer Keroh, Kampung Tun Razak, Batu Berendam, Taman Merdeka, Taman Bunga Raya, Taman Kerjasama and Taman Muzaffar Shah.

Polling districts
According to the federal gazette issued on 31 October 2022, the Ayer Keroh constituency is divided into 8 polling districts.

Representation history

Election results

References

Malacca state constituencies